Martine Michieletto (born 21 September 1992) is an Italian muay thai kickboxer. She is the reigning ISKA featherweight K-1 champion and the former WKU featherweight muay thai champion.

As of October 2022, she is ranked as the sixth best pound-for-pound women's kickboxer in the world by Beyond Kick.

Martial arts career

ISKA and WKU champion
During Steko's Fight Night, Michieletto fought in a ten-round bout against Julia Irmen for the WKU Full Contact World title. Irmen won the fight and title by a unanimous decision.

Michieletto faced Maribel de Sousa for the ISKA K-1 World Featherweight title at Muay Thai Time Vol. 2 on June 13, 2015. She won the fight by unanimous decision. Michieletto then faced Estela Garcia for the WKU Featherweight title at Thai Boxe Mania on January 30, 2016. She once again won the fight by unanimous decision.

Michieletto took part in the Iron Fight muay thai tournament, held at Iron Fight Vol3: Muay Thai Time on March 13, 2016. Although she was able to overcome Chiara Vincis by unanimous decision in the semifinals of the one-day tournament, she lost to Veronica Vernocchi by a third-round technical knockout in the finals. She rebounded from this loss with a unanimous decision over Sud Siam Sor. Sumalee at Muay Real Thai Fight on August 8, 2016. After suffering a split decision loss to Saifah Sor Suparat on August 29, Michieletto won her next two fights against Nana Tsang on October 8, 2016 and Angelina Panza on January 28, 2017.

Her two-fight win streak earned Michieletto the chance to challenge Denise Kielholtz for the Bellator Flyweight Kickboxing title at Bellator Kickboxing 5 on April 8, 2017. Kielholtz retained her title by unanimous decision.

Michieletto faced Alessia Greco at Evolution Fight on July 29, 2017. She won the fight by unanimous decision. After she beat Sud Siam Sor. Sumalee by unanimous decision on August 8, 2017, Michieletto was booked to face Federica Sbaraglia at Petrosyan Mania on October 14, 2017. She won the fight by a second-round technical knockout.

Michieletto made her first WKU featherweight title defense against Elna Nilsson at Battle of Lund IX on November 18, 2017. She managed to win the fight by a split decision.

Michieletto faced Irene Martens at Aspettando Petrosyan Mania on February 17, 2018, in her first fight of the year. She won the fight by unanimous decision. Michieletto then took part in the 2018 Fight Challenge featherweight tournament, held on March 10, 2018. She captured the tournament title after winning both her semifinal bout against Lorena Signetto and her final bout against Erika Vesan by unanimous decision.

Martine Michieletto participated in the 2018 IFMA World Championships. She scored knockout wins over Lucia Krajčovič in the quarter finals and Patricia Axling in the semifinals, both in the third round. In the finals of the 57 kg tournament she faced Anaëlle Angerville and won by a unanimous decision.

Michieletto faced Gloria Peritore at Bellator Kickboxing 10 on July 14, 2018. She won the fight by unanimous decision. Michieletto next faced Delphine Guénon at Petrosyanmania: Gold Edition on February 16, 2019. She won the fight by unanimous decision.

Michieletto made her first ISKA K-1 featherweight title defense against Veronica Vernocchi on the May 25, 2019, Oktagon event. She won the fight by unanimous decision. After retaining her championship, Michieletto faced Shanelle Dyer for the WMF Featherweight title at Evolution Fight on December 21, 2019. She won the fight by unanimous decision.

Michieletto made her second ISKA K-1 title defense against Patricia Axling at Road to Lion Fight: Sofokleus vs. Carrara on August 29, 2020. She won the fight by unanimous decision. Michieletto made her third ISKA K-1 title defense against Ella Maria Grapperhaus at Antares Fight Night 2 on July 9, 2022. She won the fight by unanimous decision.

ONE Championship
During ONE on TNT 4, Chatri Sityodtong announced that Michieletto would face former GLORY Super Bantamweight Champion Anissa Meksen in a strawweight kickboxing bout on May 28, 2021 at ONE Championship: Empower. The event featured the first ever all-female fight card in ONE Championship. Michieletto was later replaced by Cristina Morales.

Michieletto made her third ISKA K-1 World Featherweight title defense against Ella Maria Grapperhaus at Antares Fight Night on July 9, 2022. She won the fight by unanimous decision.

Championships and accomplishments

Amateur
World Traditional Kickboxing Association
 2011 WTKA Amateur World Championship
International Federation of Muaythai Associations
 2016 Tafisa World Games Muay Thai -57 kg Championship
 2018 IFMA World -57 kg Championship

Professional
International Sport Karate Association
ISKA World K-1 Featherweight Championship (One time, current)
Three successful title defenses
World Kickboxing and Karate Union
WKU World Featherweight Muay Thai Championship (One time, former)
One successful title defense
World MuayThai Federation
WMF World Featherweight Muay Thai Championship (One time, current)

Fight record

|-  style="background:#cfc;"
| 2022-07-09|| Win ||align=left| Ella Maria Grapperhaus || Antares Fight Night 2 || Edolo, Italy || Decision (Unanimous) || 5 || 3:00
|-
! colspan="8" style="background:white" |
|-  style="background:#cfc;"
| 2020-08-29|| Win ||align=left| Patricia Axling ||  Road to Lion Fight: Sofokleus vs. Carrara  || Rosolini, Italy || Decision (Unanimous) || 5 || 3:00
|-
! colspan="8" style="background:white" |
|-  style="background:#cfc;"
| 2020-01-02|| Win ||align=left| Laura De Blas || PetrosyanMania: Gold Edition || Milan, Italy || Decision (Unanimous) || 3 || 3:00
|-  style="background:#cfc;"
| 2019-12-21|| Win ||align=left| Shanelle Dyer || Evolution Fight || Rosolini, Italy || Decision (Unanimous) || 5 || 3:00
|-
! colspan="8" style="background:white" |
|-  style="background:#cfc;"
| 2019-05-25|| Win ||align=left| Veronica Vernocchi || Oktagon || Monza, Italy || Decision (Unanimous) || 5 || 3:00
|-
! colspan="8" style="background:white" |
|-  style="background:#cfc;"
| 2019-02-16|| Win ||align=left| Delphine Guénon || Petrosyanmania: Gold Edition  || Monza, Italy || Decision (Unanimous) || 3 || 3:00
|-  style="background:#cfc;"
| 2018-07-14|| Win ||align=left| Gloria Peritore || Bellator Kickboxing 10 || Rome, Italy || Decision (Unanimous) || 3 || 3:00
|-  style="background:#cfc;"
| 2018-03-10|| Win ||align=left| Erika Vesan || Fight Challenge, Tournament Final || Casale Monferrato, Italy || Decision (Unanimous) || 3 || 3:00
|-  style="background:#cfc;"
| 2018-03-10|| Win ||align=left| Lorena Signetto || Fight Challenge, Tournament Semifinal  || Casale Monferrato, Italy || Decision (Unanimous) || 3 || 3:00
|-  style="background:#cfc;"
| 2018-02-17|| Win ||align=left| Irene Martens || Aspettando Petrosyan Mania || Milan, Italy || Decision (Unanimous) || 3 || 3:00
|-  style="background:#cfc;"
| 2017-11-18|| Win ||align=left| Elna Nilsson || Battle of Lund IX || Lund, Sweden || Decision (Split) || 5 || 3:00 
|-
! colspan="8" style="background:white" |
|-  style="background:#cfc;"
| 2017-10-14|| Win ||align=left| Federica Sbaraglia || Petrosyan Mania || Monza, Italy || TKO (Punches) || 2 ||
|-  style="background:#cfc;"
| 2017-08-08 || Win ||align=left| Sud Siam Sor. Sumalee || Chiag Mai Boxing Stadium  || Chiang Mai, Thailand || Decision (Unanimous) || 5 || 2:00
|-  style="background:#cfc;"
| 2017-07-29|| Win ||align=left| Alessia Greco || Evolution Fight || Rosolini, Italy || Decision (Unanimous) || 5 || 3:00
|-  style="background:#fbb;"
| 2017-04-08|| Loss ||align=left| Denise Kielholtz || Bellator Kickboxing 5 || Torino, Italy || Decision (Unanimous) || 5 || 3:00
|-
! colspan="8" style="background:white" |
|-  style="background:#cfc;"
| 2017-01-28|| Win ||align=left| Angelina Panza || Thai Boxe Mania || Torino, Italy || Decision (Unanimous) || 3 || 3:00
|-  style="background:#cfc;"
| 2016-10-08|| Win ||align=left| Nana Tsang || Tafisa World Games || Jakarta, Indonesia || Decision (Unanimous) || 3 || 3:00
|-  style="background:#fbb;"
| 2016-08-29 || Loss ||align=left| Saifah Sor Suparat || The Best of The Year: Thaphae Boxing Stadium || Chiang Mai, Thailand || Decision (Split) || 5 || 2:00
|-  style="background:#cfc;"
| 2016-08-08|| Win ||align=left| Sud Siam Sor. Sumalee || Muay Real Thai Fight || Chiang Mai, Thailand || Decision (Unanimous) || 3 || 3:00
|-  style="background:#fbb;"
| 2016-03-13|| Loss ||align=left| Veronica Vernocchi || Iron Fight Vol3: Muay Thai Time, Tournament Final || Cogoleto, Italy || TKO (Doctor Stoppage) || 3 ||
|-  style="background:#cfc;"
| 2016-03-13|| Win ||align=left| Chiara Vincis || Iron Fight Vol3: Muay Thai Time, Tournament Semifinal || Cogoleto, Italy || Decision (Unanimous) || 3 || 3:00
|-  style="background:#cfc;"
| 2016-01-30|| Win ||align=left| Estela Garcia || Thai Boxe Mania || Torino, Italy || Decision (Unanimous) || 5 || 3:00
|-
! colspan="8" style="background:white" |
|-  style="background:#cfc;"
| 2015-06-13|| Win ||align=left| Maribel de Sousa || Muay Thai Time Vol. 2 || Cogoleto, Italy || Decision (Unanimous) || 5 || 3:00
|-
! colspan="8" style="background:white" |
|-  style="background:#fbb;"
| 2015-05-07|| Loss ||align=left| Julia Irmen || Steko's Fight Night || Germany || Decision (Unanimous) || 10 || 2:00
|-
! colspan="8" style="background:white" |
|-  style="background:#cfc;"
| 2015-03-01|| Win ||align=left| Chiara Vincis || Total Kombat || Milan, Italy || TKO (Retirement) || 1 ||
|-  style="background:#c5d2ea;"
| 2014-12-14 || Draw ||align=left| Michela Galli || Trofeo Fight 1 || Forte dei Marmi, Italy || Decision (Split) || 3 || 3:00
|-  style="background:#cfc;"
| 2014-11-29 || Win ||align=left| Vanessa De Waele || Jesolo Fight Night || Jesolo, Italy || Decision (Unanimous) || 3 || 3:00
|-  style="background:#cfc;"
| 2014-11-09 || Win ||align=left| Toulassi Leila || WFC World Championship || Milano, Italy || Decision (Unanimous) || 3 || 3:00
|-  style="background:#cfc;"
| 2014-11-08 || Win ||align=left| Maria Garcia Espejo || WFC World Championship || Milano, Italy || Decision (Unanimous) || 3 || 3:00
|-  style="background:#c5d2ea;"
| 2014-10-19 || Draw ||align=left| Sandy Manfrotto || Born To fight || Milano, Italy || Decision (Split) || 3 || 3:00
|-
|-  style="background:#cfc;"
| 2014-06-22 || Win ||align=left| Alice Galli ||  || Milano, Italy || Decision (Unanimous) || 3 || 3:00
|-
|-  style="background:#cfc;"
| 2014-05-18 || Win ||align=left| Alice Galli || Fight in Disco || Pinerolo, Italy || Decision (Unanimous) || 3 || 3:00
|-
|-  style="background:#cfc;"
| 2014-04-27 || Win ||align=left| Emilie Schaeffer || Full Contact || Milano, Italy || Decision (Unanimous) || 3 || 2:00
|-
|-  style="background:#cfc;"
| 2014-04-05 || Win ||align=left| Maria Ciraolo || Coppa Italia Fight 1 || Milano, Italy || Decision (Unanimous) || 3 || 2:00
|-
|-  style="background:#cfc;"
| 2013-12-08|| Win ||align=left| Michela Galli || Pisa Abbraccia lo Sport || Pisa, Italy || Disqualification || 1 || 3:00
|-
|-  style="background:#cfc;"
| 2013-10-20 || Win ||align=left| Michela Socci || Pitbull Arena || Pisa, Italy || TKO || 2 || 2:30
|-
|-  style="background:#cfc;"
| 2013-09-28 || Win ||align=left| Miriam Sabot || Gorizia Fight Night || Gorizia, Italy || Decision (Unanimous) || 3 || 3:00
|-
|-  style="background:#cfc;"
| 2013-07-20 || Win ||align=left| Perla Bragagnolo || WFC || Vinovo, Italy || Decision (Unanimous) || 3 || 3:00
|-
! colspan="8" style="background:white" |
|-
|-  style="background:#cfc;"
| 2013-06-30 || Win ||align=left| Martina Mercinelli || WFC The Right Way || Chieri, Italy || Decision (Unanimous) || 3 || 3:00
|-
|-  style="background:#cfc;"
| 2013-06-01 || Win ||align=left| Roxana Gaal || Thai Boxe sotto le Stelle || Chieri, Italy || Decision (Unanimous) || 3 || 3:00
|-
|-  style="background:#fbb;"
| 2013-05-18 || Loss ||align=left| Jacqueline Berroud || Internationaux de Thionville || Thionville, France || Decision (Split) || 4 || 2:00
|-
|-  style="background:#cfc;"
| 2013-03-24 || Win ||align=left| Camilla Tarozzi ||  || Vanzaghello, Italy || TKO|| 1 || 1:14
|-
|-  style="background:#fbb;"
| 2013-02-23 || Loss ||align=left| Miriam Sabot || Fight Warriors || Milano, Italy || Decision (Unanimous) || 3 || 3:00
|-
|-  style="background:#fbb;"
| 2012-12-15 || Loss ||align=left| Martina Moro || Campione on the Ring || Switzerland || Decision (Split) || 3 || 3:00
|-
|-  style="background:#cfc;"
| 2012-11-24 || Win ||align=left| Francesca Lungi || Low Kick || Rovellasca, Italy || Decision (Unanimous) || 3 || 3:00
|-
|-  style="background:#fbb;"
| 2012- || Loss ||align=left| Martina Moro || Best of The Best || Rovellasca, Italy || Decision || 5 || 3:00
|-
! colspan="8" style="background:white" |
|-
|-  style="background:#c5d2ea;"
| 2012-06-23 || Draw ||align=left| Martina Mercinelli || Impetus || Pinerolo, Italy || Decision (Split) || 3 || 3:00
|-
|-  style="background:#fbb;"
| 2012-06-09 || Loss ||align=left| Paola Cappucci || Fight Night Valdarno || Valdarno, Italy || TKO || 2 || 2:10
|-
| colspan=9 | Legend:    

|-  style="background:#cfc;"
| 2018-05-18|| Win ||align=left| Anaëlle Angerville  || IFMA World Championship -57 kg Tournament, Final || Cancun, Mexico || Decision (Unanimous)|| 3 || 3:00 
|-
! style=background:white colspan=9 |
|-  style="background:#cfc;"
| 2018-08-16|| Win ||align=left| Patricia Axling  || IFMA World Championship -57 kg Tournament, Semi Final || Cancun, Mexico || KO (Punches)|| 3 ||
|-  style="background:#cfc;"
| 2018-08-14|| Win ||align=left| Lucia Krajčovič  || IFMA World Championship -57 kg Tournament, Quarter Final || Cancun, Mexico || KO (Punches)|| 3 ||
|-  style="background:#cfc;"
| 2016-06-05|| Win ||align=left| Michela Socci || Campionati Italiani Muay Thai Fight1 || Rimini, Italy || Decision (Unanimous) || 3 || 3:00
|-  style="background:#cfc;"
| 2015-11-|| Win ||align=left| Samira Bounhar || K1 Amateur World Championships, Final || Tuscany, Italy || Decision (Unanimous)|| 3 || 3:00 
|-
! style=background:white colspan=9 |
|-
| colspan=9 | Legend:

See also
 List of female kickboxers

References 

Italian kickboxers
1992 births
Italian female kickboxers
Living people
People from Aosta
Sportspeople from Aosta Valley